Tianjun railway station was a station on the Chinese Qingzang Railway. The station has abandoned after the Guanjiao Tunnel was opened.

See also

 Qingzang Railway
 List of stations on Qingzang railway

Railway stations in Qinghai
Stations on the Qinghai–Tibet Railway